"It's a Demo" is the 1986 debut single by American hip hop duo Kool G Rap & DJ Polo. Originally a non-album single with "I'm Fly" as a B-side, a remix of the track was featured on the duo's 1989 album Road to the Riches and later on the compilation albums Killer Kuts (1994), The Best of Cold Chillin' (2000), Greatest Hits (2002) and Street Stories: The Best of Kool G Rap & DJ Polo (2013).

Background
The song was recorded at Marley Marl's home studio in Queensbridge, Queens, New York City and was originally indented to be a demo track. It proved to be popular, however, and became Kool G Rap & DJ Polo's first single, premiered by DJ Mr. Magic on WBLS days after it was recorded. In a 2011 interview, Kool G Rap recalled:

Samples
"It's a Demo" samples the following songs:
"Funky Drummer" by James Brown
"Singers" by Eddie Murphy

And was later sampled on:
"Mister Cee's Master Plan" by Big Daddy Kane featuring Mister Cee
"Butcher Shop" by Kool G Rap & DJ Polo
"First Nigga" by Kool G Rap
"Nostalgia" by Marco Polo featuring Masta Ace

Track listing
A-side
 "It's a Demo" (3:59)
 "It's a Demo" (Dub)

B-side
 "I'm Fly" (5:43)
 "I'm Fly" (Dub) (5:32)

References

External links
 "It's a Demo" at Discogs

1986 debut singles
Kool G Rap songs
Songs written by Marley Marl
Songs written by Kool G Rap
Song recordings produced by Marley Marl
1986 songs
Cold Chillin' Records singles